Furkan Muharrem Kurban (born 2 June 1997) is a Dutch-born, Turkish footballer currently playing as a midfielder for Anadolu Selçukspor.

Career statistics

Club

Notes

References

External links
 Profile at AZ Alkmaar

1997 births
Living people
Dutch people of Turkish descent
Turkish footballers
Turkey youth international footballers
Dutch footballers
Association football midfielders
AZ Alkmaar players
AFC Ajax players
1922 Konyaspor footballers
Eerste Divisie players
Footballers from Amsterdam